Samir Djoghlal (born 2 May 1981), better known as L'Algérino, is an Algerian-French rapper and singer whose family came from the Chaoui-Berber tribes in Khenchela, Algeria.

A childhood friend of JUL, he was discovered in 2001 by rapper Akhenaton, a member of the IAM group, who signed him on his 361 Recordz label, and in which he published his first album " Les derniers seront les premiers" (English: The Last will be the First), in June 2005. Aged 25, L'Algérino becomes the first Marseille artist signed on an independent Paris label, the Sinik Six-O-Nine.

Career

Samir Djoghlal known as 'L'Algérino' of Algerian parents, was born in 1981 in Marseille. He was introduced to rap at a very young age listening to Suprême NTM and IAM in the northern districts of Marseille. He started rapping at the age of 11 and quickly began releasing mixtapes and appearing in local concerts.

He had brief stints with groups 'B-Vice Junior' and '45 Niggaz', releasing independent albums with both of them. The work of Algérino is produced in its early days by Hichem Gombra and Hafid Fédaouche (HF Production), with whom he recorded his first maxi two titles called "T'sais c'est qui qui cause?" (English: Do You Know who's talking?), whose instrumental is composed by Soprano of Psy4 De La Rime. He officially made a name for himself when he appeared on Psy 4 de la Rime's album "Block Party".

L'Algérino was discovered in 2004 by Akhenaton, a member of the IAM group, who signs him on his label 361 Records; his first album, "Les derniers seront les premiers" (English:The Last will be the First), is distributed by Naïve Records and released in 2005. The group offers him the first parts of their concerts, with Psy4 De La Rime. During a concert in Chambéry,

L'Algérino and Sinik share the poster and meet for the first time. It is in Paris that they meet again several times and plan to move together after the departure of Sam 361 Records. Aged 25, L'Algérino became the first Marseille artist to be signed on an independent Paris label, Six-O-Nine. After relative success of his debut album, he released in 2007 album "Mentalité pirate" (English: Pirate attitude), which gained fame, through tracks like "L'envie de vaincre" (English: the desire to conquer), "Fleur fanée", (English: Faded flower) and the sentimental "Entre deux flammes" (English: Between two flames).

In March 2010, L'Algerino released his third album "Effet miroir" (English: Mirror Effect), which reaches 20th place in the French chart. The hit single "Sur la tête de ma mère" (English: On the head of my mother) became a huge popular success for the singer; the song starts as: "Saturday night, at full moon, the wolves come out of their lairs, the wolves are beautiful, dress in the most beautiful ways ..."

At the end of 2011, the rapper from Marseille released his fourth album, "C'est correct" (English: That's correct), whose single "Avec le sourire" (English: With the smile), a reggae song, goes around radios all over France; the album reaches 26th place in the French chart. "Aigle royal" (English: Royal Eagle), his next album, is released in 2014, followed by his sixth album entitled "Oriental Dream" at Black Pearl Music in October 2015. L'Algerino's seventh album "Banderas" was released in October 2016 and reached 12th place in the French chart.

In May 2017, he released his single "Les menottes (Tching Tchang Tchong)" (English: Handcuffs, Tching Tchang Tchong), which was a success, and has received over 590 million YouTube views as of June 2020.

The song "Va Bene", from the Taxi 5 soundtrack, was recorded in 2018 and released on March 23, 2018 on YouTube, where it has the song has 280 million views. It reached number 2 on the French SNEP charts.

Discography

Albums

Singles

*Did not appear in the official Belgian Ultratop 50 charts, but rather in the bubbling under Ultratip charts.

Featured in

Other songs

2007: "Tapage nocturne"
2007: "L’envie de vaincre"
2010: "Trinité"
2010: "Marseille by night"
2010: "Tireur de coup franc"
2010: "Derapage contrôlé"
2010: "Pas la pour leur plaire"
2011: "Allô Maman Bobo"
2011: "Bayna"

References

External links
 Official Website
 Official MySpace
 Official SkyRock Page

1980 births
Living people
French rappers
French people of Algerian-Berber descent
Musicians from Marseille